This is a list of notable Amish and their descendants, including both those who lived or are living culturally as Amish or Amish Mennonite as well as those who recognize themselves culturally as Amish or Amish Mennonite descendants but may or may not practice Anabaptist beliefs. This list does not include those of Mennonite religion only, who are not culturally connected to Switzerland and South Germany and the persecution documented in the Martyrs Mirror.

To be included in this list, the person must either have a Wikipedia article showing they are Amish or Amish Mennonite or are of Amish or Amish Mennonite descent or must have references showing their claim and are notable.

List

Art
David Hostetler, carpenter and sculptor
Henry Lapp, artist and carpenter
Aaron and Abner Zook, twin 3D artists

Education
Solomon DeLong, Pennsylvania German language writer and journalist
Joseph Donnermeyer, professor of criminology
Joseph Funk, musician, educator
John A. Hostetler, author and educator
Donald Kraybill, educator
Joseph Yoder, musician and educator

Entertainment
Mose Gingerich, documentary filmmaker
Kate Stoltzfus, actress and model
Verne Troyer, actor

Literature
Stephen Beachy, author 
Julia Kasdorf, poet
Christmas Carol Kauffman, author
Beverly Lewis, Christian fiction author 
Helen Reimensnyder Martin, author
Lorin Morgan-Richards, author and illustrator
Sarah Price, fiction author 
John D. Roth, author
Stephen Scott, author

Religion
Moses M. Beachy, bishop of the Beachy Amish Mennonite
Harold S. Bender, professor of theology and publisher of The Mennonite Quarterly Review
John S. Coffman, religious leader 
Heinrich Funck, religious author and bishop
John F. Funk, Mennonite leader who headed the Mennonite Publishing Company
Hans Herr, considered first Mennonite bishop to emigrate to America
Guy Hershberger, religious educator
Jacob and Anna Hostetler, spiritual leaders of the Jesus Church of Washington and leaders of the Amish-Mennonite Evangelism Network of the United Pentecostal Church
Alan Kreider, religious professor
Gerald Miller, medical missionary
Elmo Stoll, bishop and founder of the "Christian Communities"
Sanford Calvin Yoder, religious scholar and WWI conscientious objector
Tripp York, religious educator

Other
Anne F. Beiler, entrepreneur and founder of Auntie Anne's
Milton Hershey, founder of Hershey Chocolate
Jacob Hochstetler (1704–1775), folk hero 
Jeff Hostetler, professional football player
Nellie Miller-Mann, humanitarian
Jerome Monroe Smucker, entrepreneur and founder of Smuckers
Gene Stoltzfus, American peace activist
Carl Yoder, industrialist

See also

Jakob Ammann
Hans Reist
Pennsylvania Dutch
Amish & Mennonite Heritage Center

References

+
+
Lists of American people by ethnic or national origin
Amish in popular culture
American Amish people
Amish